A lace card is a punched card with all holes punched (also called a whoopee card, ventilator card, flyswatter card, or IBM doily). They were mainly used as practical jokes to cause disruption in card readers. Card readers tended to jam when a lace card was inserted, as the resulting card had too little structural strength to avoid buckling inside the mechanism. Card punches could also jam trying to produce cards with all holes punched, owing to power-supply problems. When a lace card was fed through the reader, a card knife or card saw (a flat tool used with punched card readers and card punches) was needed to clear the jam.

See also
 Black fax
 Christmas tree packet
 Denial of service
 List of practical joke topics

Notes

References

Punched card
Practical joke devices
Denial-of-service attacks